Styela adriatica is a hermaphroditic ascidian tunicate that is found along the northern Atlantic and Mediterranean coast of Europe

References

External links

Stolidobranchia
Animals described in 1976